Richard Wade Farley (born July 25, 1948) is an American convicted mass murderer. A former employee of ESL Incorporated in Sunnyvale, California, he stalked his co-worker Laura Black for four years beginning in 1984. Black obtained a temporary restraining order against him on February 2, 1988, with a court date set for February 17, 1988 to make the order permanent.

On February 16, 1988, Richard Farley shot and killed seven people at ESL and wounded four others, including Laura Black. He was convicted of seven counts of first degree murder, and is currently on death row at San Quentin.

Early life
Richard Farley was born July 25, 1948 in Texas. He was the oldest of six children. His father was in the military, therefore the family frequently relocated, and eventually settled in California. He graduated from high school in 1966 and attended Santa Rosa Junior College. Farley then joined the United States Navy in 1967 where he stayed for ten years. After his discharge in 1977, Farley began working as a software technician at ESL Inc., a defense contractor in Sunnyvale, California.

Stalking
In April 1984, 35-year-old Richard Farley met 22-year-old Laura Black, who also worked at ESL Inc. Farley described himself as immediately smitten and later said that he instantly "fell in love" with Black. Farley began leaving gifts, including letters and homemade baked goods, on Laura Black's desk and asked her out numerous times. Black repeatedly refused the invitations and later said in an interview that she "...tried really to ignore him but to be cordial". Despite her refusals, Farley persisted; he began calling her desk every few hours as well as showing up at Black's aerobics class. By providing false information to the ESL HR department through pretexting, Farley was able to obtain Black's home address and home phone number. Farley was also known to have befriended the custodial department in an attempt to copy keys to Black's desk so he could rifle through her files to gain an insight into her life. He was also known to have pried through confidential personnel files of Black through false pretenses.

During this time, Farley was sending one or two letters to Black a week. Though there were periods of time during which the letters would cease, in total Farley sent about two hundred letters over a period of four years, with the final letter sent from his prison cell after his rampage at ESL. Black moved four times during those four years, but Farley was able to obtain her address every time. Farley doctored photos of him and Black being together and mailed them to her.

In fall of 1985, Black asked the Human Resources Department at ESL for help. ESL ordered Farley to attend psychological counseling sessions, and despite attending these sessions, his harassment of Black continued. By spring of 1986, Farley was threatening fellow ESL employees. Because of his poor performance, his employment with ESL was terminated in May 1986. He had been working for ESL for nine years and spent several months stalking Black full-time, then found work at a rival company, Covalent Systems Corporation in Sunnyvale.

Shooting at ESL
Black filed for a temporary restraining order against Farley on February 2, 1988 and it was granted by a family court judge.  A court date was set for February 17, 1988 to see if the restraining order should be made permanent.

Farley bought a shotgun and various other weapons and equipment. The restraining order did not prevent him from buying weapons during that time. He also owned a variety of other weapons which were not present during the shooting at ESL, including a Mossberg shotgun barrel and a Ruger .22 LR carbine and over 3,000 rounds of ammunition.  On February 9, 1988, he left a package with Black's attorney, claiming to have evidence that he and Black had a longstanding relationship. The package included items such as photographs purportedly showing Black and Farley on dates, a garage door opener to Black's house, and hotel and credit card receipts.  Farley claimed that Black kept a stash of cocaine that they shared once.  Black's attorney dismissed the package as utter fabrications.

On the day before the court date, February 16, 1988, Farley drove his motorhome to the ESL parking lot in Sunnyvale, California. He later claimed he waited for Black to leave work so he could convince her to rescind the restraining order. If she refused, he would kill himself.  At about 3:00 p.m., Farley loaded up his guns, a 12-gauge Benelli Riot semi-automatic shotgun, a Ruger M-77 .22-250 rifle with a scope, a Mossberg 12-gauge pump-action shotgun, a Sentinel .22 WMR revolver, a Smith & Wesson .357 Magnum revolver, a Browning BDA .380 ACP pistol, and a Smith & Wesson 9mm pistol. He had a foot-long Buck knife and smoke bomb and wore a bulletproof vest, earplugs, and a leather glove.

Carrying over 1,000 rounds of ammunition with him, he approached the building while shooting toward bystanders. He entered a side door by shooting through the glass, and shot at employees he encountered while heading toward Black's office on the second floor. Several employees were killed by his shots as he made his way through the building. Arriving at Black's office, he opened her door which she slammed in his face. He fired a shotgun round through the door, hitting her in the left shoulder and collapsing a lung. The injury sent her unconscious to the floor while Farley moved on.

Farley then held a police SWAT team at bay for five hours by moving from room to room so the SWAT snipers could not target him.  Meanwhile, Black regained consciousness and managed to prevent her wound from bleeding further while she and other survivors hid from Farley.  Black and other survivors eventually escaped, and Farley surrendered to police after requesting a sandwich and a soft drink.  Seven people were killed by Farley with four more wounded, including Black.  Ninety-eight rounds were fired.

Victims
Dead
Lawrence J. Kane, 46, from San Jose
Wayne "Buddy" Williams Jr., 23, from San Jose
Ronald G. Doney, 36, from Manteca
Joseph Lawrence Silva, 43
Glenda Moritz, 27
Ronald Steven Reed, 26
Helen Lamparter, 49, from Sunnyvale

Injured
Laura Black
Gregory Scott
Richard Townsley
Patty Marcott

Aftermath
The next day, court commissioner Lois Kittle made the restraining order against Farley permanent and commented, "Pieces of paper do not stop bullets."

Black survived, but was hospitalized for nineteen days. She continued to work for the same company. Farley wrote to her again from his prison cell, claiming that she had finally won.

During trial, Farley admitted to the killings, but pled not guilty, claiming that he never planned to kill but only wished to get Black's attention or commit suicide in front of her for rejecting him. His attorney claimed that Farley was never a violent man and only had his judgement temporarily clouded by his obsession with Black, and that he would likely never kill again. Prior to the shooting, Farley did not have a criminal record.

The prosecution documented every step of the stalking, produced all the letters he sent, and documented his shotgun and ammunition purchases a week before his rampage at ESL, as well as his other weapons.  All this amounted to extensive planning, which was evidence of premeditation.

On October 21, 1991, Farley was found guilty of all seven counts of first degree murder.  On January 17, 1992, Superior Court Judge Joseph Biafore Jr. sentenced Farley to death.  Because of California law, there were several automatic appeals. On January 22, 1992, Farley was admitted to San Quentin State Prison. On July 2, 2009, the California Supreme Court upheld Farley's death sentence (People v Richard Farley (2009) 46 Cal.4th 1053).  , Farley is still on death row at San Quentin State Prison, as CDCR Number H23501.

This massacre helped prompt the State of California's 1990 passage of the first anti-stalking laws in the U.S.

In media 
A movie, I Can Make You Love Me (also known as Stalking Laura in the United Kingdom) was made in 1993. Brooke Shields played Black and Richard Thomas played Farley.

The shooting incident is also the subject of a chapter of the book Chinese Playground: A Memoir by Bill Lee, as well as a chapter in Obsession by John Douglas and Mark Olshaker.

The shooting is also the subject of a chapter of the book The Gift of Fear: Survival Signals That Protect Us From Violence by Gavin de Becker.

This shooting is also mentioned in the TV seris Whitechapel (UK, Season 2, Episode 2).

See also
 List of death row inmates in the United States
 List of homicides in California

References

External links

Bill Lee's book, "Chinese Playground"
Associated Press news report (Page one and page two) via Newspapers.com

1948 births
1988 mass shootings in the United States
1988 murders in the United States
20th-century American criminals
American male criminals
American mass murderers
American people convicted of murder
American prisoners sentenced to death
Crime in California
Criminals from California
Criminals from Texas
Living people
People convicted of murder by California
People from Sunnyvale, California
Prisoners sentenced to death by California
Stalking
Mass shootings in the United States
Workplace violence in the United States